The City of Heidelberg was a local government area about  northeast of Melbourne, the state capital of Victoria, Australia.

History

Heidelberg was first incorporated as a trust in 1840, making it one of the earliest local government formations in Australia. On 12 October 1860, it became a road district, administered by a Roads Board. It became a shire on 27 January 1871, and was proclaimed a city on 11 April 1934. In the 1960s, it lost significant sections of its territory; on 1 October 1962, the neighbouring City of Northcote annexed its South Ward, and on 30 September 1964, the Shire of Diamond Valley was created out of its mostly rural North Ward.

On 15 December 1994, the City of Heidelberg was abolished, and along with parts of the Shires of Diamond Valley and Eltham, was merged into the newly created City of Banyule. A small area near La Trobe University was transferred to the City of Darebin.

Council meetings were held at the Heidelberg Town Hall, on Upper Heidelberg Road, Ivanhoe. It is still used for the same purpose by the City of Banyule.

Wards

The City of Heidelberg was subdivided into five wards, each electing three councillors:
 Banyule Ward
 Eaglemont Ward
 Heidelberg West Ward
 Ivanhoe Ward
 Macleod Ward

Suburbs
 Bellfield
 Eaglemont
 Heidelberg
 Heidelberg Heights
 Heidelberg West
 Ivanhoe*
 Ivanhoe East
 Macleod (shared with the Shire of Diamond Valley)
 Rosanna
 Viewbank
 Yallambie

* Council seat.

Population

* Estimate in the 1958 Victorian Year Book.
+ Includes the two sections severed in 1962-1964.

References

External links
 Victorian Places - Heidelberg

Heidelberg
Heidelberg, Victoria
City of Banyule
1840 establishments in Australia
1994 disestablishments in Australia